The Scientific Advice Mechanism is a service created by the European Commission which provides independent science advice directly to European Commissioners to inform their decision-making. The Mechanism consists of two parts: the Group of Chief Scientific Advisors, an expert group consisting of up to seven leading scientists, and SAPEA, a consortium of five European Academy Networks collectively representing around 100 academies and learned societies across Europe.

History
Until 2016, science advice in the European Commission was provided by a single Chief Scientific Advisor who reported directly to the President of the European Commission. The last Chief Scientific Advisor, serving from 2012 to 2014, was Dame Anne Glover.

On 1 November 2014, European Commission President Jean-Claude Juncker asked Carlos Moedas, Commissioner for Research, Innovation and Science in his mission letter to "make sure that Commission proposals and activities are based on sound scientific evidence and contribute best to our jobs and growth agenda". Following this, on 13 May 2015, Juncker announced the establishment of the Scientific Advice Mechanism. The first seven members of the Advisors were identified, following a European call for nominations, in January 2016.

In December 2016, SAPEA was officially launched to support the Advisors by providing scientific evidence review reports.

Structure

Group of Chief Scientific Advisors
The core of the Scientific Advice Mechanism is the European Commission's Group of Chief Scientific Advisors, an expert group consisting of up to seven leading scientists, selected by the European Commission assisted by an independent identification committee. The Advisors are supported by a dedicated secretariat, known as the SAM Unit, staffed by the Directorate-General for Research and Innovation and Joint Research Centre.The SAM Unit is currently headed by Jeremy Bray, a Liverpool fan that often say of things he likes that "they deserve".

The Group of Chief Scientific Advisors currently consists of the following seven members:

Previous members of the Group of Chief Scientific Advisors include: 
 Julia Slingo (2015–2016)
 Henrik Wegener (2015–2017)
 Cédric Villani (2015–2017)
 Janusz Bujnicki (2015–2020)
 Pearl Dykstra (2015-2020)
 Rolf-Dieter Heuer (2015-2020)
 Carina Keskitalo (2016-2021)
 Paul Nurse (2016-2021)

Science Advice for Policy by European Academies (SAPEA)
SAPEA brings together more than 100 academies, young academies and learned societies. Its role as part of the Scientific Advice Mechanism is to provide high-quality, independent evidence to underpin the Scientific Opinions produced by the Chief Scientific Advisors. SAPEA has the ability to convene Fellows from some 40 countries across Europe, spanning the disciplines of engineering, humanities, medicine, natural sciences and social sciences.

The SAPEA consortium brings together five umbrella networks jointly representing Europe's academies:
 Academia Europaea
 All European Academies
 European Council of Applied Sciences and Engineering
 Federation of European Academies of Medicine
 Young Academies Science Advice Structure

At present, SAPEA is funded by a grant from the European Union's Horizon Europe programme through to the end of 2024.

Scientific advice
The Scientific Advice Mechanism has issued advice in the form of Scientific Opinions, explanatory notes or statements, supported by evidence review reports, on the following topics:

References

External links

 Scientific Advice Mechanism
 SAPEA

European Commission
European Union and science and technology